Paul Robert Bernard (born 30 December 1972) is a Scottish former professional footballer, who played as a midfielder for Oldham, Aberdeen, Barnsley, Plymouth Argyle, St Johnstone and Drogheda United. Bernard represented Scotland twice, with both appearances coming in 1995.

Career
He was born in Edinburgh but moved to Manchester as a small child in the mid-1970s, and grew up as a Hearts supporter.

Bernard started his career with Oldham Athletic, and is remembered for scoring the equaliser in the famous 3–2 win over Sheffield Wednesday in only his second game for the club during the 1990–91 season when the Latics sealed the Second Division title and returned to the First Division after a 68-year exile. He was soon a regular player in the Boundary Park midfield, helping them achieve survival in the First Division in 1991–92 and the new FA Premier League in 1992–93. He helped them reach the FA Cup semi-finals in the 1993–94 campaign, and when the Latics took the lead over Manchester United with an extra time goal by Neil Pointon, it looked as though Bernard and his teammates were on their way to the club's first ever FA Cup final. However, a late equaliser by United's Mark Hughes forced a replay, which the Latics lost 4–1 at Maine Road. They were relegated on the final day of the season after only managing a 1–1 draw with Norwich City. He played a total of 112 league games for the Latics, scoring 18 goals.

He was then transferred to Aberdeen for £1M on 27 September 1995, and he remains the only player that a Scottish club outside the Old Firm has spent £1 million on. Soon after joining Aberdeen, Bernard helped them to win the Scottish League Cup, but his career suffered after this point due to injuries and loss of form. As such Bernard has been associated with the misguided spending of Aberdeen in the 1990s, when relatively large amounts were spent without much success. Bernard was released by Aberdeen in 2001 after six seasons, 99 league games and six goals.

His playing career finished in 2006 after a year-long spell in Ireland with Drogheda United.

He was capped twice by the Scottish national team at senior level, with both of his appearances coming in 1995, following 16 under 21 and two "B" caps earlier in the decade.

Honours
 Scottish League Cup
 Winner (1): 1995 (Aberdeen)
 FAI Cup
 Winner (1): 2005 (Drogheda United)

References

External links 

1972 births
Aberdeen F.C. players
Barnsley F.C. players
Living people
Oldham Athletic A.F.C. players
Footballers from Edinburgh
Plymouth Argyle F.C. players
Premier League players
Scotland B international footballers
Scotland international footballers
Scottish Football League players
Scottish footballers
Scottish Premier League players
St Johnstone F.C. players
English Football League players
Scotland under-21 international footballers
Drogheda United F.C. players
Association football midfielders